Bryan T. Kaenrath (born 1983) is an American politician from Maine. Kaenrath graduated from the University of Maine in 2006 and was elected to the Maine House of Representatives that year representing the western end of South Portland. He was re-elected in 2010 for his 3rd term.

In January 2012, Kaenrath announced his candidacy for the Maine Senate District 7. Cynthia Dill vacated the seat in order to run for the United States Senate. Kaenrath lost the Democratic primary to Rebecca Millett but was chosen as a replacement candidate for his former house seat, which he won re-election to for a fourth time. He was unable to seek re-election in 2014 due to term-limits and was replaced by his 2012 opponent, Republican Kevin Battle.

In July 2015, Kaenrath became the town manager of Gouldsboro, Maine, and he served for almost three years. In March 2018, he became the town administrator of North Hampton, New Hampshire. As of January 1, 2020, Kaenrath is the City Administrator of Saco, Maine.

References

1983 births
Living people
Politicians from South Portland, Maine
Democratic Party members of the Maine House of Representatives
University of Maine alumni
Marist College alumni
Maine city managers